The amount of heat energy received at any location on the globe is a direct effect of Sun angle on climate, as the angle at which sunlight strikes Earth varies by location, time of day, and season due to Earth's orbit around the Sun and Earth's rotation around its tilted axis. Seasonal change in the angle of sunlight, caused by the tilt of Earth's axis, is the basic mechanism that results in warmer weather in summer than in winter. Change in day length is another factor.

Geometry of Sun angle 

Figure 1 presents a case when sunlight shines on Earth at a lower angle (Sun closer to the horizon), the energy of the sunlight is spread over a larger area, and is therefore weaker than if the Sun is higher overhead and the energy is concentrated on a smaller area.

Trigonometry tells us that the sine of a 30° angle is 1/2, whereas the sine of a 90° angle is 1. Therefore, the sunbeam hitting the ground at a 30° angle spreads the same amount of light over twice as much area (if we imagine the Sun shining from the south at noon, the north–south width doubles; the east–west width does not). Consequently, the amount of light falling on each square mile is only half as much.

Figure 3 shows the angle of sunlight striking Earth in the Northern and Southern Hemispheres when Earth's northern axis is tilted away from the Sun, when it is winter in the north and summer in the south.

Technical note
Heat energy is not received from the Sun. Rather, radiant energy is received and this results in change in energy level of receiving bodies in Earth's domain. Different materials have different properties for transmitting back received energy in the form of heat energy at different rates.

See also
 Axial tilt
 Declination
 Solar irradiance (Insolation)
 Sun path

References

Climate variability and change
Seasons
Atmospheric radiation